Eurycephalus is an invalid longhorn beetle generic name  first published by the British zoologist John Edward Gray in 1831. It is now considered to be a junior objective synonym of the genus Tapeina established by the French entomologists Amédée Lepeletier and Jean Guillaume Audinet-Serville in 1828. Several other organisms were also named Eurycephalus by other zoologists that have since been invalidated. They are listed below with their current accepted name:

Eurycephalus Dejean, 1835 (junior homonym) = Euryphagus J. Thomson, 1864 
- A cerambycid beetle genus belonging to the tribe Trachyderini
Eurycephalus Imamura, 1996 (junior homonym) = Sunagocia Imamura, 2003
- A genus of flathead fish
Eurycephalus Agassiz, 1846 (misspelling) = Eurocephalus A. Smith, 1836
- A genus of passerine birds in the shrike family

References